Irritant folliculitis is a cutaneous condition that usually occurs following the application of topical medications.

See also 
 Irritant diaper dermatitis
 List of cutaneous conditions

References 

Contact dermatitis